The Kota Kinabalu City Hall (abbreviated DBKK; is the city council which administers the city and district of Kota Kinabalu in the state of Sabah, Malaysia. The council consists of the mayor plus twenty-four councillors appointed to serve a one-year term by the Sabah State Government.

History 
The history of the town of Jesselton can be traced since the administration of British North Borneo Company (BNBC) in 1881. Throughout the administration under the Federation of Malaysia since 1963, the town subsequently renamed into Kota Kinabalu and a council was later established after it was granted city status on 2 February 2000. Kota Kinabalu was formerly administrated by Majlis Perbandaran Kota Kinabalu (MPKK) or the Kota Kinabalu Municipal Council. Their jurisdiction covers an area of 351 square kilometres encompassing the sub-districts and towns of, among others, Tanjung Aru, Kepayan, Kota Kinabalu city, Luyang, Inanam, Menggatal, Telipok, Likas and Sepanggar.

Appointed mayors of Kota Kinabalu 
Since 2000, the city has been led by five mayors. The previous mayors are listed as below:

Mascot 
The official mascot of Kota Kinabalu including:
 Ardeidae/Egretta alba
 Orchidaceae/Phalaenopsis amabilis
 Casuarinaceae

References

External links 

 

Kota Kinabalu
Kota Kinabalu
City councils in Malaysia